The 1858 United States House of Representatives election in Florida was held on Monday, October 4, 1858 to elect the single United States Representative from the state of Florida, one from the state's single at-large congressional district, to represent Florida in the 36th Congress. The election coincided with the elections of other offices, including various state and local elections.

The winning candidate would serve a two-year term in the United States House of Representatives from March 4, 1859, to March 4, 1861.

Candidates

Democratic

Nominee 

 George Sydney Hawkins, incumbent U.S. representative

Independent Democratic

Declared 

 John Westcott, former Surveyor General of Florida

Campaign
This election was held in the middle of the presidency of James Buchanan, with tensions between free states of the North and slave states of the South growing to the point of irreparability. Both the Whig Party and the Know Nothing Party had already collapsed, leaving no true opposition to the Democratic Party in Florida. Hawkins was very popular in the former Whig stronghold of Pensacola, bringing the populous city firmly into the Democratic column. Though Hawkins was expected to run unopposed, he was challenged by Westcott, the former surveyor general of Florida and brother of former U.S. senator James Westcott. Westcott, running as an Independent Democrat, was opposed to the corruption in the Florida Democratic Party, perceiving the party's selection of nominees at conventions making the state's politicians open to political patronage. Westcott also promised cheap land to frontier settlers.

Westcott performed best in the frontierlands of East Florida and South Florida, where he was very popular due to his role in the Seminole Wars. Despite this, he could not make inroads into West Florida and was crushed in the general election, only receiving 38% of the vote to Hawkins' 62%.

General election

Results

Results by County

Aftermath
This was the last election before the American Civil War to send a U.S. representative to Congress. An election was held in 1860, but the winner of that race did not serve in Congress as Florida seceded from the Union prior to the start of the 37th Congress. Hawkins withdrew from Congress on January 21, 1861 after Florida had joined the Confederate States of America. This was the last successful congressional election in Florida until 1868.

See also
United States House of Representatives elections, 1858

References

1852
Florida
United States House of Representatives